The 1926 Princeton Tigers football team represented Princeton University in the 1926 college football season. The team finished with a 5–1–1 record under 13th-year head coach Bill Roper.  The Tigers' sole loss of the season was to Navy by a 27–13 score. No Princeton players were selected as first-team honorees on the 1926 College Football All-America Team.

Schedule

References

Princeton
Princeton Tigers football seasons
Princeton Tigers football